Zhengzhou or Zheng Prefecture was a zhou (prefecture) in imperial China centering on modern Zhengzhou, Henan, China. It existed (intermittently) from 583 until 1913 after the foundation of the Republic.

The modern prefecture-level city of Zhengzhou, created only in 1948, retains its name.

Counties
Zheng Prefecture administered the following counties for the most part of history:

Two other counties, Yangwu and Zhongmu were part of Zheng Prefecture during the Tang dynasty, but after Later Liang (except briefly during Later Tang) they were administered by Kaifeng Prefecture.

References

 
 
 

Former prefectures in Henan
Prefectures of the Sui dynasty
Prefectures of the Tang dynasty
Prefectures of the Song dynasty
Prefectures of the Jin dynasty (1115–1234)
Prefectures of the Yuan dynasty
Prefectures of the Ming dynasty
Prefectures of the Qing dynasty
Prefectures of Later Tang
Prefectures of Later Zhou
Prefectures of Later Liang (Five Dynasties)
Prefectures of Later Jin (Five Dynasties)
Prefectures of Later Han (Five Dynasties)
583 establishments
6th-century establishments in China
1913 disestablishments in China